Shawn Susan Batten is an American actress most known for her role as the second Sara Cummings (1997–1999) in NBC's soap opera Sunset Beach and Natalia Carlisle on Spyder Games (2001).

Early life and education 
Batten grew up in Ramsey, New Jersey. She earned a BFA in theatre from Syracuse University and studied modern dance at New York University.

Career 
Batten began her career with appearances in several commercials, off-broadway plays, and television pilots. Soon after signing with William Morris Agency (now William Morris Endeavor), Batten worked as a production assistant for VH1 and MTV. She eventually landed the role of Sara Cummings in Sunset Beach. Batten stayed with the show until its cancellation in 1999. She then joined the cast of teen drama Spyder Games, where she played the leading role and appeared in 59 out of 60 episodes.

Batten made numerous guest appearances on TV series, with recurring roles on Beverly Hills 90210, The Sklar Brothers; Apt. 2F, and The Lone Gunman. Roles in feature films such as Academy Award Best Picture nominee Quiz Show, and award-winning indie films One Dog Day and Delinquent.

Besides a one-episode appearance on the short-lived Don Johnson series Just Legal in 2006 and several commercials and voiceover projects.

Personal life 
She married longtime boyfriend, Toto guitarist, Steve Lukather, in 2002. They had two children and divorced in 2010.

Filmography

Film

Television

References

External links
 

Living people
Year of birth missing (living people)
Actresses from Kansas City, Missouri
American soap opera actresses
American television actresses
21st-century American women